Paul Hugh Dibble  (born 20 March 1943) is a New Zealand sculptor.

Biography
Born in Thames on 20 March 1943 and raised on a farm in Waitakaruru on the Hauraki Plains, Dibble was educated at Thames High School. He trained at the Elam School of Fine Arts, University of Auckland from 1963, graduating with a Diploma of Fine Arts with Honours in 1967.

Dibble was appointed to lecture painting and sculpture at the Palmerston North College of Education in 1977. Between 1997 and 2002 he lectured in art at Massey University. He has produced a wide range of pieces and has mounted many one-man exhibitions beginning with the Barry Lett Gallery in Auckland in 1971. In 2000 he established his own bronze foundry for larger works, and is one of a small number of New Zealand sculptors who does his own large-scale casting.

He received grants from the QEII Arts Council in 1979 and 1985, and held a residency at the Dowse Art Museum in Lower Hutt in 1987–88. Dibble was appointed a Member of the New Zealand Order of Merit, for services to the arts, in the 2005 New Year Honours, and in 2007 he was awarded an honorary Doctor of Fine Arts degree by Massey University.

Dibble's work is held in public collections in New Zealand, including that of the Museum of New Zealand Te Papa Tongarewa, the Dowse Art Museum, Te Manawa in Palmerston North, and the Christchurch Art Gallery.

In 2016, the Stuart Residence Halls Council gifted Dibble's sculpture Pathways to the University of Otago, to celebrate the council's 75th anniversary.

In May 2018 Dibble's sculpture The Garden 2002 was unveiled in Havelock North by Governor-General Dame Patsy Reddy.

Notable commissions
 New Zealand War Memorial, London

Gallery

Further reading

References

1943 births
Living people
People from Thames, New Zealand
People educated at Thames High School
Elam Art School alumni
Academic staff of the Massey University
Members of the New Zealand Order of Merit
20th-century New Zealand sculptors
20th-century New Zealand male artists
21st-century New Zealand sculptors
21st-century New Zealand male artists